Hanna Paulsberg (born 13 November 1987 in Rygge, Norway) is a Norwegian jazz musician (tenor saxophone) and composer.

Career 

Paulsberg started playing saxophone at the age of fifteen, after listening to a cd with American saxophone player Stan Getz. The year after, she started the music program at "Kirkeparken videregående skole" in Moss, where she got her Examen artium in 2009. Later she became a graduate of the Jazz program at Trondheim Musikkonsevatorium in 2011, and released her debut album Waltz For Lilli (2012), including Trygve Waldemar Fiske (double bass), Oscar Grönberg (piano) and Hans Hulbækmo (drums).

Paulsberg often play with the renowned Trondheim Jazz Orchestra. In November 2016 they joined Chick Corea for two nights and four concerts at the Blue Note Jazz Club in New York City.

Hanna Paulsberg is the initiator and songwriter for the vocal trio GURLS including Rohey Taalah and Ellen Andrea Wang. In 2018 they released the album Run, Boy, Run. The album won the 2018 Norwegian Grammy award in the jazz category. They opened for a-ha in a sold out Oslo Spektrum for two nights in a row in  February 2018, and they performed at the Norwegian Grammys the same year.

Honors 

2011: Titled "Young Nordic Jazz Comets"
2011: Trondheim Jazz Festival Young Talent Award
2015: Titled NTNU Jazzambassador 2015
2018: Spellemannsprisen (Norwegian Jazz Grammy) for Run boy, run with GURLS.
2019: Rolf Gammleng prisen 
2020: Ella prisen (Oslo Jazzfestivals hederspris)
2021: Spellemannsprisen (Norwegian Jazz Grammy) for Velkommen Håp with FlUkten.

Discography 

Hanna Paulsberg Concept
2012: Waltz For Lilli (Øra Fonogram)
2014: Song For Josia (Øra Fonogram)
2016: Eastern Smiles (ODIN Records)
2018: Daughter of the Sun (ODIN Records)

GURLS
 2018: Run Boy, Run (Grappa)

As sideman:

Trondheim Jazz Orchestra
2012: The Death Defying Unicorn (Rune Grammofon), feat. Ståle Storløkken & Motorpsycho live at Moldejazz 2010
2014: Lion (ACT), feat. Marius Neset
2014: Ekko (MNJ Records), feat. Elin Rosseland
2017: Antropocen (Fanfare) feat SKRAP

Others
2021: Velkommen Håp - Flukten (Odin Records 2021)
2020: If you listen carefully, the music is yours - Gard Nilssen Supersonic Orchestra (Odin Records 2020)
2019: The Moon Doesn't Drink - Lyder Øverås Røed (Jazzland 2019)
2019: We Are The Granddaughters Of The Witches You Didn't Burn - FINITY (Jazzland 2019)
2018: Atlantis - SKRAP (Fanfare 2018)
2017: Carla. The Fish - Espen Rud (Curling Legs 2017)
2016: I eit landskap - Dag-Filip Roaldsnes Ensemble (NORCD 2016)
2016: Reiseliv - Torstein Ekspress (Just for the Records 2016)
2016: Scripted Conversations - Simen Kiil Halvorsen (AMP Records 2016)
2016: Trøst for stusslige karer - Håkon Paulsberg (Grammofon 2016)
2014: Snøkorn - Thomas Torstrup (Just for the records 2014)
2014: Elevenette - Dan Peter Sundland (Øra Fonogram 2014)
2014: Ændre sida - Håkon Paulsberg (Grammofon 2014)
2013: Bror K - Bror K (Selskapsplater 2013)
2012: Kjellerbandet - The beat goes on – A tribute to Buddy Rich (Normann Records 2012)
2008: Kjellerbandet - Hyllest til Thad Jones - Kjellerbandet/Tore Johansen (Normann Records 2008)

References

External links

Avant-garde jazz musicians
Norwegian jazz saxophonists
Norwegian jazz composers
Norwegian University of Science and Technology alumni
Musicians from Rygge
1987 births
Living people
21st-century saxophonists
Women jazz saxophonists